Macey Cone is a small hill,  high, which marks the remnants of an extinct volcanic cone surmounting the lava cliffs at the northwest end of Laurens Peninsula, about  northeast of Cape Laurens at the northwest end of Heard Island. The feature was surveyed in 1948 by the Australian National Antarctic Research Expeditions, who named it for L.E. Macey, a senior radio operator with the expedition.

References

Volcanoes of Heard Island and McDonald Islands